Hud or HUD may refer to:

Entertainment
 Hud (1963 film), a 1963 film starring Paul Newman
 Hud (1986 film), a 1986 Norwegian film
 HUD (TV program), or Heads Up Daily, a Canadian e-sports television program

Places
 Hud, Fars, Iran
 Hud, Kohgiluyeh and Boyer-Ahmad, Iran
 Hongkong United Dockyards, a dockyard in Hong Kong

Acronym
 Head-up display, a visual display technology for airplanes, cars and others
 Heads-up display (video games), a method of visually representing information in video games
 United States Department of Housing and Urban Development, a division of the U.S. federal government
 Hubble Ultra-Deep Field

Other uses 
 Hud (prophet), an Islamic prophet whom some identify with Eber
 Hud (sūrah), the eleventh chapter of the Qur'an, which contains an account of the prophet Hud
 HuD (protein), a human gene, an RNA-binding protein
 nickname of Haydn Hud Rickit (born 1951), New Zealand former rugby union player
 HUD, IATA airport code of Humboldt Municipal Airport (Iowa)